Lin Xiang (born 24 September 1991 in Shanghai) is a Chinese footballer who plays as a goalkeeper for Kunshan.

Club career
In 2010, Lin Xiang started his professional footballer career with Shanghai Shenxin in the Chinese Super League. On 25 October 2015, Lin made his debut for Shanghai Shenxin in the 2015 Chinese Super League against Henan Jianye. Often utilized as a second choice goalkeeper, he was allowed to leave the club on 19 February 2019 and transferred to League Two side Zibo Cuju. He would go on to establish himself as an integral member of the team and go on to gain promotion with the club at the end of the 2020 China League Two campaign. Despite this achievement he was not kept on at the club and on 27 April 2022 he joined second tier club Kunshan where he was part of the squad that won the division and promotion to the top tier.

Career statistics 
Statistics accurate as of match played 21 December 2022.

Honours

Club 
Kunshan
 China League One: 2022

References

External links
 

1991 births
Living people
Chinese footballers
Footballers from Shanghai
Shanghai Shenxin F.C. players
Chinese Super League players
China League One players
Association football goalkeepers
21st-century Chinese people